Laura Inés Fernández (born 18 December 1990) is an Argentine dancer, choreographer, TV host, model and actress. She is known for her participation in Showmatch: Bailando por un sueño, for hosting the youth program Combate, and being the best host alongside Ángel de Brito in the reality show program Cantando 2020.

Biography 
She was born and raised in the neighborhood of Mataderos, Buenos Aires, in a house on Fonrouge and Alberdi, together with his parents, Carlos Fernández and Inés Stork Banquer, and her younger sister, Gabriela. After their separation, she went to live with her mother in Liniers.

Acting career 
In 2010 she had a participation in the opening dance of the film Igualita a mí where she kisses the character of Adrián Suar as a teenager.

In 2012 she was selected for the youth series Violetta, but shortly after she was released. She later revealed that she got fired from her for working on Showmatch.

She made his theater debut in the summer of 2015, in the play Ghost House alongside Pedro Alfonso, Emilio Disi, Luciana Salazar, Freddy Villarreal, Benjamín Amadeo, Lizy Tagliani and Lourdes Sánchez. She also starred in the children's play Zooigico. in 2016.

In the summer of 2016 she worked on the play Enredados (Tangled) together with Florencia de la V, Osvaldo Laport, Iliana Calabró, Federico Bal, Sebastián Almada, Bárbara Vélez and Ailen Bechara. She also starred in the children's play Tierra de Oz.

She got a secondary role in the daily strip Quiero vivir a tu lado, where his character interferes with Darío Barassi and Jimena Barón.

In 2018 she became the replacement for Griselda Siciliani in the play Sugar, together with Nicolás Cabré and Federico D'Elía, and signed a contract for the theatrical season, together with him and Victorio D'Alessandro.

In 2018, she was the winner as female revelation of the ACE award, the most important theater award in Argentina, for her leading role in Sugar.

From 2019 to 2020 she stars in the theater Departamento de Bachelor, along with Nicolás Cabré, Martin Seefeld and a great cast. Role that gave her her second ACE Award nomination for Best Actress in a Comedy.

Career 
In 2010 she made her debut on the reality program dance competition Bailando por un sueño in a role of dancer, accompanying Matías Alé.

From 2011 to 2012 she was Federico Baldino's dancer, a participant in Soñando por bailar, who wanted to participate in Bailando por un sueño. They managed to reach the semifinals but Magdalena Bravi won them.

She later participated in Bailando 2012, taking on the role of dancer for former Gran Hermano media star Cristian U., with whom she obtained 11th place after five months of competition.

In 2014 she again participated in the Bailando, this time as a dancer for the renowned director Aníbal Pachano, with whom she obtained ninth place after seven months of competition. In turn, she was called to be the choreographer for the green and red teams in the new youth program, Combate.

In 2015 she participated in the Bailando 10 años, where his partner was the actor Federico Bal. After seven months of competition they manage to be crowned champions; in turn began to gain more popularity. In Combate she assumed a new role as captain of the green team together with the singer el Polaco, and later together with the athlete Federico Molinari.

She left the play Tangled to join the leadership of Combate evolution, along with Thiago Batistuta and El Pollo Álvarez. She participated, this time as a figure, in Bailando 2016 where his partner was again Federico Bal and, after seven months of program, they were eliminated in the semifinals by Polaco and Barby Silenzi. She also starred in the children's play Land of Oz.

In 2017, she joined the LAM program as a temporary panelist. She participated in Bailando 2017, where his partner was again Federico Bal and, after seven months of the program, they were runners-up, losing by the actress Flor Vigna.

She also debuted on the radio with his own program Dale que vale! on the frequency Vale 97.5.

She assumed an important role and became a jury member of Bailando 2018 together with the journalist Ángel de Brito, the actress Florencia Peña and the journalist Marcelo Polino.

In 2019, she was able to travel to Mexico to participate as a guest judge on Pequeños Gigantes, a talent reality show on the Las Estrellas network.

In addition, in the summer she hosted a radio program on CNN Radio Argentina. She later launched his own web show, Jagalau, through his Instagram.

In July 2020, she took on the role of host of Cantando por un sueño, along with Ángel de Brito, in her biggest hosting project to date, broadcast by eltrece.

On January 25, 2021, she temporarily assumed leadership of LAM, replacing Ángel de Brito, who was in isolation after contact with a person with COVID-19.

Filmography

Cinema

TV

Theater

Radio

Awards and nominations

References 

Argentine female dancers
Argentine dancers
Bailando por un Sueño (Argentine TV series) participants
Bailando por un Sueño (Argentine TV series) judges
1990 births
Living people